The Canadian Honours of 2021 were announced on 30 December 2020.

The Order of Canada

Companions of the Order of Canada

 Robert Daniel Steadward, CC, AOE

Officers of the Order of Canada

 John Borrows, OC, FRSC
 Helen M. Burt, OC
 John Challis, OC
 Elizabeth A. Edwards, OC
 Peter E. Gilgan, OC, OOnt
 J. Edward Johnson, OC
 Daniel Heath Justice, OC
 Vivian McAlister, OC
 Tony Penikett, OC
 The Hon. Lynn Smith, OC, QC
 Daniel Taylor, OC
 Yanick Villedieu, OC, CQ
 Lori Jeanne West, OC

Members of the Order of Canada

 Mary S. Aitken, CM
 Yaprak Baltacioğlu, CM
 Art Bergmann, CM
 Guy Berthiaume, CM
 Myer Bick, CM
 Carolle Brabant, CM
 Michael S.W. Bradstreet, CM
 John W. Brink, CM
 Barbara Elizabeth Butler, CM
 James Casey, CM, MSM
 Brian Cherney, CM
 Gina Cody, CM
 David Cooper, CM
 Michel Cusson, CM
 Rita Davies, CM
 Serge Demers, CM
 Stan Dragland, CM
 L. David Dubé, CM
 Jacalyn Duffin, CM, FRSC
 John G. Geiger, CM
 Susan R. George Bahl, CM
 Vivek Goel, CM
 Gary Gullickson, CM
 John Hartman, CM
 Fr. James Lassiter Holland, CM, AOE, OMI
 Sally Horsfall Eaton, CM, CD
 Ray Ivany, CM, ONS
 Michael A.S. Jewett, CM
 Elder Carolyn King, CM
 R=obert Krell, CM
 Susan Keiko Langdon, CM
 Larry J. Macdonald, CM
 The Hon. Louise Mailhot, CM, OQ
 Marilyn McHarg, CM, OOnt
 Cheryl Lisa Meeches, CM, OM
 Andrew Molson, CM
 Geoff Molson, CM, CQ
 Morris Moscovitch, CM
 Ginette Noiseux, CM
 Leonard Pennachetti, CM
 Lloyd R. Posno, CM
 Heather Ross, CM
 Terry Salman, CM
 Brian Segal, CM
 Douglas R. Stollery, CM, QC
 Frances Westley, CM
 Frances Elizabeth Wright, CM, AOE

Order of Military Merit

Termination of appointment
 Captain (Retired) Jean-Charles Perreault

(Notice is hereby given that the appointment of Captain (Retired) Jean-Charles Perreault to the Order of Military Merit was terminated by Ordinance signed by the Administrator of the Government of Canada on February 3, 2021.

[Dated] Ottawa, April 10, 2021

[Signed] Ian McCowan
Secretary General of the Order of Military Merit)

Order of Merit of the Police Forces

Officers of the Order of Merit of the Police Forces

 Deputy Chief Brian Bigras, O.O.M.
 Detective Bruce Chapman, O.O.M.
 Deputy Chief Howard Chow, O.O.M. (This is a promotion within the Order)
 Chief Nishan J. Duraiappah, O.O.M. (This is a promotion within the Order)
 Chief Superintendent Keith Douglas Scott Finn, O.O.M.
 Deputy Chief Rajwinder Singh Gill, O.O.M.
 Superintendent Eric Gordon, O.O.M.
 Associate Director-General André Goulet, O.O.M.
 Inspector Daffydd F. Hermann, O.O.M.
 Superintendent Deanna Hill, O.O.M.
 Chief Panagiotis (Peter) Lambrinakos, O.O.M. (This is a promotion within the Order)
 Chief Constable Mark W. Neufeld, O.O.M. (This is a promotion within the Order)
 Sergeant Sean Plater, O.O.M., M.B.
 Ms. Kelly Colleen Rainbow, O.O.M.
 Chief Allan G. Sauve, O.O.M. (This is a promotion within the Order)

Members of the Order of Merit of the Police Forces

 Deputy Chief Marc Andrews, M.O.M.
 Superintendent Robert Scott Baptist, M.O.M.
 Superintendent John Michael Baranyi, M.O.M.
 Associate Director Caroline Bernard, M.O.M.
 Chief Keith Hunter Blake, M.O.M.
 Chief Lorne Blumhagen, M.O.M.
 Ms. Paula Brown, M.O.M.
 Chief Julia Cecchetto, M.O.M.
 Inspector David Anthony Dalal, M.O.M., C.D.
 Staff Sergeant Gurinder Dhanoa, M.O.M.
 Deputy Chief Ryan K. Diodati, M.O.M.
 Inspector Lori S. Doonan, M.O.M.
 Superintendent Ralph Paul Ehlebracht, M.O.M.
 Chief Superintendent Mark Flynn, M.O.M.
 Staff Sergeant Valarie Gates, M.O.M.
 Deputy Chief Daryl Goetz, M.O.M.
 Superintendent Pauline Anne Gray, M.O.M.
 Staff Sergeant Stephen Alexander Halliday, M.O.M. (Retired)
 Ms. Rhonda Harte-Pittman, M.O.M.
 Deputy Chief Shirley Hilton, M.O.M.
 Sergeant Gordon T. Hughes, M.O.M.
 Deputy Chief Randal A. Huisman, M.O.M.
 Superintendent Jennifer Ann Hyland, M.O.M.
 Sergeant Ralph Kaisers, M.O.M.
 Inspector Francis Patrick Conor King, M.O.M.
 Captain Jean J. L. Lafrenière, M.O.M.
 Patrol Sergeant Grant Lindgren, M.O.M.
 Detective Superintendent Mark A. Loader, M.O.M.
 Chief Daryl R. Longworth, M.O.M.
 Inspector Bethany Dawn McAndie, M.O.M.
 Deputy Chief Kathryn A. McLellan, M.O.M.
 Superintendent Karen A. Meyer, M.O.M.
 Chief Superintendent Brad J. Mueller, M.O.M.
 Staff Sergeant Robert W. Patterson, M.O.M., C.D.
 Deputy Chief Gordon Perrier, M.O.M.
 Chief J. David Poirier, M.O.M.
 Inspector Michael J. Procyk, M.O.M.
 Inspector Michael Purdy, M.O.M.
 Inspector Susan Riddell, M.O.M.
 Chief Hugh Stevenson, M.O.M.
 Mr. Steven James Strang, M.O.M.
 Chief Superintendent Sean Anthony Sullivan, M.O.M.
 Superintendent Peter Kamal Tewfik, M.O.M.
 Corporal Christopher D. Voller, M.O.M.
 Staff Sergeant Darcy J. Woolfitt, M.O.M.
 Superintendent Kelly Young, M.O.M.

Termination of appointments
 Inspector (Retired) Glenn Louis Howard Trivett (Ontario Provincial Police) 
 Police Chief (Retired) Frank Elsner (Victoria Police Department)

Most Venerable Order of the Hospital of St. John of Jerusalem

Knights and Dames of the Order of St. John
 Her Honour the Honourable Salma Lakhani
 Leslie Helen Jack, Branch Manager at St. John Ambulance (Burlington, Ontario)

Commanders of the Order of St. John
 Michael David Dan, C.M., O.Ont.
 Lieutenant-Colonel Jason Brent English, M.M.M., C.D.=
 Lieutenant-Colonel Carl Gauthier, M.M.M., C.D., AdeC
 Major Éric Girard, C.D.
 Commander Scott Edward Nelson, M.V.O., C.D., AdeC

Officers of the Order of St. John
 Frank S. Beals
 Michel Doré
 Ronald Larry Green, C.D.
 Heather M. G. Leong
 Claire Elizabeth Mackley
 Lieutenant Joseph Henry Serge Malaison, C.D.
 Lieutenant-Colonel William Andrew Sergeant, O.M.M., C.D., A.D.C. (Retired)
 Martin Wong

Members of the Order of St. John
 Kim Almond-Pike
 Nicholas James Nathan Barrett
 Barry Ernest Boughen
 Captain Jason Charles Burgoin, C.D.
 Kevin Ka Jun Chan
 Leon Harold Ren-Bo Chew
 Captain Jacques François Marc-André Delisle, C.D.
 Isabelle Derasp
 Jason Andrew Dippel
 Susan Eldersby
 Jean-Pierre Flores
 Martin Garreau
 Matthew James Gauthier
 Sarah Giesbrecht
 Jacques Gosselin
 Brendan Hilton Grue
 Joanne Haggstrom
 Emilie Hamel
 Murray Clair Hamer
 Jennifer Susan Hauser
 Warrant Officer Andrew Christian Derek Hilland, C.D.
 John Richard Hoadley
 Adam C. L. Kinnear
 Robert Dale Leepart
 Nancy Legris
 Anthony Ho Ching Leung
 Ralph Leung
 Judith E. MacArthur
 Diana Eve MacKenzie
 Sean David McCue
 Carol Miller
 James Douglas Mitchell
 Melanie Victoria Moore
 Sean Christopher Morris
 Sylvia Susan Nobbs
 William Michael Grant Osborne
 Michael Otto
 Laura Adele Parrott
 Jonathan Pepin
 Jean Maurice Pigeon
 Gail Anne Pirie
 Joyce Geraldine Anne Polley
 Chanse Wayne Proulx
 Lieutenant-Colonel Felipe Quiroz-Borrero, C.D.
 Barbara Ann Renkers
 Lee Gregory Roche
 Emilie Nicole Romita
 Sander Francis Sarioglu
 Douglas William Sirant
 John Charles Tousignan
 Chance Kenneth Veinotte

Provincial & Territorial Honours

National Order of Québec

Grand Officers of the National Order of Québec

 M. Guy Rocher (promotion)

Officers of the National Order of Québec

 M. Renaldo Battista
 M. Ivan Bernier
 M. Guy Breton
 Mme Sophie Brochu
 M. Brian Bronfman
 Mme Louise Caouette-Laberge
 M. Fernand Dansereau
 M. Jean-Pierre Ménard
 M. Serge Ménard
 Mme Suzanne Sauvage
 M. David Saint-Jacques
 M. Jean-Marc Vallée
 M. Jean-P. Vézina

Knight of the National Order of Québec

 M. Steve Barakatt
 M. Louis Bernatchez
 M. Charles Binamé
 M. Marcel Boyer
 Mme Madeleine Careau
 M. Guillaume Côté
 M. Mario Cyr
 M. Gaston Déry
 Mme Claire Deschênes
 Mme Johanne Elsener
 Mme Anne-Marie Hubert
 Mme Florence Junca-Adenot
 Mme Louise Latraverse
 M. Andrew Molson
 Mme Michèle Ouimet
 Mme Morag Park
 M. Claude Provencher
 Mme Jennifer Stoddart
 Mme Sophie Thibault
 Mme Sylvie Vachon

Saskatchewan Order of Merit
 Mavis Ashbourne-Palmer
 Michael Bishop
 Albert Brown
 Marie-Anne Day Walker-Pelletier, CM
 Hart Godden
 Solomon Ratt

Order of Ontario
Appointments to the Order of Ontario for 2021 have not been announced.

Order of British Columbia
 Chief Joe Alphonse
 Joe Average, MGC
 Brenda Baptiste
 Frances Belzberg, OC
 Dr. Debra Braithwaite
 Ajay Dilawri
 Debra Doucette (Hewson)
 Dr. Bonnie Henry
 Carol A. Lee
 James McEwen
 Andrew Petter, CM, QC
 Dolph Schluter
 Dr. Poul Sorensen
 Arran and Ratana Stephens
 Marvin Storrow, QC

Alberta Order of Excellence
 Joan Donald, CM
 Dr. Cyril Kay, OC, FRSC, FCAHS
 Murray McCann, MSM
 Dr. Barb Olson
 Dr. Merle Olson
 Dr. Greg Powell, OC, FRCPC
 Lena Heavy Shields-Russell
 Cor van Raay

Order of Prince Edward Island
 Noreen Corrigan-Murphy
 Maitland MacIsaac
 Dr. Heather Morrison

Order of Manitoba
 Steve Bell
 Franklin (Lynn) Bishop
 Ruth Christie
 Dr. Michael Eskin, CM
 Dr. Gordon Goldsborough
 Gregg Hanson, CM
 Kyle Irving
 Ava Kobrinsky
 Claudette Leclerc
 Doris Mae Oulton
 Greg Selinger
 Arni Thorsteinson

Order of New Brunswick
 Wesley Armour, CM
 Edward Barrett
 Armand Caron
 David Christie
 Madeleine Dubé
 Huberte Gautreau
 Constantine Passaris
 Dr. Jennifer Russell
 Ralph Thomas
 Elizabeth Weir

Order of Nova Scotia
 Ronald Bourgeois
 Lee Cohen
 Saeed El-Darahali
 Paula Marshall
 Wanda Robson

Order of Newfoundland and Labrador

 John R. Barrett
 David Gordon Bradley
 N. Louise Bradley, CM
 Fred Budgell
 Dr. Alice M. Collins
 Marlene Creates
 Dr. Donald Bruce Dingwell, OC
 Lester C. Powell
 Dr. Ted O. Rosales

Order of Nunavut
Appointments to the Order of Nunavut for 2021 have not been announced.

Order of the Northwest Territories
Appointments to the Order of the Northwest Territories for 2021 have not been announced.

Order of Yukon
 Peter Menzies
 David Mossop
 Dr. David Storey

Meritorious Service Decorations

Meritorious Service Cross (Civil Division)

 Helen Margaret (Peggy) Truscott, M.S.C. (posthumous)
 Robin Wettlaufer, M.S.C.

Meritorious Service Medal (Civil Division)

 Bassel Ramli, M.S.M.
 Omar Salaymeh, M.S.M.
 Pierre Allard, M.S.M. (posthumous)
 Annie Roy, M.S.M.
 Stephen Allen, M.S.M.
 Don Wright, M.S.M.
 Ken Zakem, M.S.M.
 Roger Augustine, M.S.M.
 Yahya Badran, M.S.M.
 Mohamed Hage, M.S.M.
 Kurt D. Lynn, M.S.M. (posthumous)
 Lauren Elizabeth Rathmell, M.S.M.
 Carolyn Elsie Louise Bateman, O.P.E.I., M.S.M.
 Joan Elaine Hoffman te Raa, M.S.M. (posthumous)
 Betty Begg-Brooks, M.S.M.
 Elyse Benoît, M.S.M.
 Maryse Bouvette, M.S.M.
 Isabelle Delisle, M.S.M. (posthumous)
 Suzanne Fitzback, M.S.M.
 Robert Gendron, M.S.M.
 Maureen Bianchini-Purvis, M.S.M.
 April Billard, M.S.M.
 Joan Bell Chaisson, M.S.M.
 Dana Bookman, M.S.M.
 Clarence Bourgoin, M.S.M.
 Alan Broadbent, C.M., M.S.M.
 Scott Bryan, M.S.M.
 William Di Nardo, M.S.M.
 William C. Brooks, M.S.M.
 Georges Edward Potvin, M.S.M.
 William Frederick George Williams, M.S.M.
 Didier Calvet, M.S.M.
 Claude Caron, M.S.M.
 Roland Case, M.S.M.
 Stephanie Case, M.S.M.
 Susan Chalmers-Gauvin, M.S.M.
 Igor Dobrovolskiy, M.S.M.
 Shannon Christensen, M.S.M.
 Diane Lee Clemons, M.S.M.
 Michael Clemons, O.Ont., M.S.M.
 Jocelyn Dianne Cousineau, M.S.M.
 Captain Médric Léo Robert Cousineau, S.C., M.S.M., C.D. (Ret’d)
 Marie-France Dubreuil, M.S.M.
 Patrice Lauzon, M.S.M.
 Jeremy Dutcher, M.S.M.
 Marilyn L. Dyck, M.S.M.
 Corey Fleischer, M.S.M.
 Jean-Martin Fortier, M.S.M.
 Serge Fournier, M.S.M.
 Robert Lessard, M.S.M.
 Jonathan Michaud, M.S.M.
 Brother Réjean Gadouas, M.S.M.
 Larry Gauthier, M.S.M.
 Rick Goodwin, M.S.M.
 James Adrian Gehrels, M.S.M. (posthumous)
 Glenn C. Stronks, M.S.M.
 Isabelle Genest, M.S.M.
 Catherine Morissette, M.S.M.
 Mathieu Ouellet, M.S.M.
 Claude B. Gingras, M.S.M.
 Art Gruenig, M.S.M.
 Robert Hughes, M.S.M.
 Colonel Robert Mark Hutchings, M.S.M., C.D., (Ret’d)
 Narmin Ismail, M.S.M.
 Brent Kaulback, M.S.M.
 Tim Kwan, M.S.M.
 Martine Laurier, M.S.M.
 Normand Martin, M.S.M.
 Pat Lazo, M.S.M.
 Steve Wilson, M.S.M.
 Brian Leavitt, M.S.M.
 Eric Rajah, A.O.E., M.S.M.
 Patricia (Patti) Leigh, O.B.C., M.S.M.
 Victoria Lennox, M.S.M.
 Cyprian Szalankiewicz, M.S.M.
 Todd McDonald, M.S.M.
 Ashley Ward, M.S.M.
 Bruce McKelvey, M.S.M.
 Janet McKelvey, O.Ont., M.S.M.
 Steve Mesler, M.S.M.
 Leigh Parise, M.S.M.
 Julia Ogina, M.S.M.
 Kelvin Redvers, M.S.M.
 T'áncháy Sarah Judith Redvers, M.S.M.
 Elaine Ruth Maxine Cormier Semkuley, M.S.M.
 Myron Semkuley, M.S.M.
 Jacques-Denis Simard, M.S.M.
 Jacques Simoneau, M.S.M.
 William J. Simpson, M.S.M., Q.C. (posthumous)
 Christopher Southin, M.S.M.
 Harry J. Stewart, M.S.M.
 Nancy Stevens, M.S.M.
 Brent Tookenay, M.S.M.
 Marian Walsh, M.S.M.
 Marion Willis, M.S.M.

Sovereign's Medal for Volunteers 

 Paulette Lenore Aamot
 Rory Allen
 Doreen June Ander
 Deborah Auchinleck
 Sandra Margaret Bartlett
 Theresa Marie Bastien
 Rémi Beaudin
 Dominique Bellemare
 Annette Bergeron
 Wilma Bianco
 Virginia Bidwell
 Pat Birchall
 Tony Birchall
 James Linscott Blake
 Ron Blechinger
 Jill Bobula
 Cathy Bonnell
 Denise Cadieux
 Elizabeth Campbell
 Dianne Ruth Campbell
 Sharon Campbell
 Robert Carr
 Shannon Carson
 Elena Catalano
 Sabrina Cataldo
 Louis Christ
 Jane Christie
 George Clements
 Geraldine Patricia Cloutier
 Carolyn Cockram
 Linda Maxine Conley
 Jennifer Paige Cook
 Sally Cooke Venne
 Barry Cornish
 Blanche Côte
 Christopher McDougal Croner
 Perry Dalton
 Maria D’Iorio
 Philippe Dugas
 Diya Duggal
 Raveena Duggal
 Barbara DuMoulin
 Derek Egan
 Hilary Feldman
 Ernest Ferne
 Jill Ferne
 William Charles Ford
 Mario Frangione
 Judy Gallant
 Maureen Gibson
 Isabel Gillissie
 Mary Lynne Golphy
 Beverly Gordon
 Kevin Lynn Graham
 Susan Graham
 Robert Groulx
 Mona Hardy
 Russell Hart
 Shelby Hayter
 Dave Hedlund
 Pam Hiensch
 John David Hind
 Lise Hodgson Madore
 Leslie Horton
 Brad Hrycyna
 D. Michael Jackson, CVO, SOM
 Hilary Johnstone
 Muhammad Azam Kahloo
 Bill Kalmakoff
 Krishan Kapila
 Brian W. Karam
 W. Douglas Keam
 Colleen Kellner
 Sandra Kerr
 Yvonne Kyle
 Krista Laberge
 Carol LaFayette-Boyd
 Gilles Landry
 Maria Lee
 Donna Leonard Robb
 Jean-Michel Longpré
 Lyn Lunsted
 Jennie MacKenzie
 Brian MacLellan
 Roger Mainville
 Donald Steve Maksymchuk
 Anne Marshall
 Randall Marusyk
 Sunita Mathur
 Daniel Matthews
 Sandi McCrory
 Raymond Charles McGill
 Michael McKay
 Ronald Francis McKay
 Donald McKinnon
 Bonnie Lynne Meadows
 Joanne Millette
 Doug Moen
 Albert Monsour
 Anna Monteduro
 Susan Morrison
 Steve Nadeau
 Donna Needham
 Janette Newcombe
 Cécile Nicole
 Annette Niven
 Primrose Paruboczy
 Richard Percy
 Vicki Plouffe
 Louise Prouse
 Roger Prouse
 Sid Robinson
 Dana Said
 Joy Saunders
 Jeff Sawatsky
 Neil Sawatzky
 Steve Scott
 Judy Shannahan
 Bernice Anna Jane Smith
 Debra Lee Smith
 Darlene Stakiw
 John Stuart
 Louise Sullivan
 Kyle Taylor
 Solange Thériault
 Ronald Theroux
 Yvonne Theroux
 Robert Thompson
 Derrick Thue
 Reginald Tweten
 Janet Uffelman
 Shelly Ullery
 Peggy Vink
 Samara Visram
 Norma Weiner
 Marion Weir
 Susan Welsh
 Janet Wilson
 Orest J. Wilura
 Travis Young
 Joanne Zuk

Commonwealth and Foreign Orders, Decorations and Medal awarded to Canadians

From Her Majesty The Queen in Right of the Commonwealth of Australia

Public Service Medal

 Mr. Charles Cameron MacLachlan

Meritorious Unit Citation

 Master Warrant Officer David Allan Joseph Kennedy, C.D.
 Corporal Wayne George Tompkins (Retired)

Australian Operational Service Medal – Border Protection
 Captain Rodney John Hallsworth, C.D.

From Her Majesty The Queen in Right of New Zealand

Member of the New Zealand Order of Merit

 Ms. Janet Lynn Lane

From Her Majesty The Queen in Right of the United Kingdom

Member of the Most Excellent Order of the British Empire (Civil Division)

 Nina Kong Vickie Yue 
 Nicholas Davies

Operational Service Medal for Iraq and Syria with Clasp

 Captain Jordan Gregory Rychlo
 Captain Scott C. Stewart, C.D.
 Sergeant Timothy Walter Parkes Ellis, C.D.
 Sergeant Patrick Edward Slack, C.D.

From the President of the Republic of Austria

Grand Decoration of Honour in Gold for Services to the Republic of Austria
 Clare Hutchinson

From the President of the Republic of Colombia

“Fe en la Causa” Military Medal, Extraordinary Category
 Brigadier-General Nicolas Dan Stanton, O.M.M., M.S.M., C.D.

From the President of the Republic of Croatia

Order of the Croatian Interlace

 Ms. Hazel McCallion, C.M.

From Her Majesty The Queen of the Kingdom of Denmark

Knight of the Royal Order of the Dannebrog
 Mr. André Vautour

From the President of the Republic of Finland

Commander of the Order of the Lion of Finland
 Judith M. Romanchuk

From the President of the French Republic

Commander of the National Order of the Legion of Honour
 Isabelle Hudon

Officer of the National Order of the Legion of Honour

 Ms. Céline Dion, C.C., O.Q.

Knight of the National Order of the Legion of Honour

 Mr. Yoshua Bengio, O.C.
 Mr. Régis Labeaume
 Ms. Ginette Reno, O.C., C.Q.

Commander of the National Order of Merit
 Lieutenant-General Wayne Donald Eyre, C.M.M., M.S.C., C.D.

Officer of the National Order of Merit
 Dr. Thierry Mesana

Knight of the National Order of Merit

 Ms. Rhonda Rioux
 Mr. Carl Viel
 Ms. Diane Audet
 Ms. Delphine Persouyre
 Mr. Gérard Poupée

Officer of the Order of Academic Palms

 Mr. Jacques Frémont

Knight of the Order of Academic Palms

 Ms. Carmen Bauer
 Mr. Michel Tremblay
 Mr. Jean-Charles Cachon
 Mr. Daniel Doz
 Mr. Brian Stock

Commander of the Order of Arts and Letters
 Mr. David Cronenberg, C.C., O.Ont.

Officer of the Order of the Arts and Letters
 Michèle Maheux

Knight of the Order of Arts and Letters 
 Ms. Monia Chokri
 Mr. Étienne Dupuis
 Wayne Carter
 Avery Rueb

Knight of the Order of Agricultural Merit
 Jean-Francis Quaglia
 Caroline Thierry

National Defence Medal, Gold Echelon
 Lieutenant-General Walter Semianiw, C.M.M., M.S.C., C.D. (Retired)

National Defence Medal, Bronze Echelon
 Lieutenant-Commander Joseph Bruno Tremblay, C.D.
 Lieutenant-Colonel Joseph Rosaire Mario Ferland, M.S.M., C.D.
 Major Alexandre Maurice Mario Ouellet, C.D.

Foreign Affairs Medal of Honour, Bronze Echelon
 Myriam Hinojosa
 Rosa-Maria Oliveira-Torres

From the President of the Federal Republic of Germany

Officer's Cross of the Order of Merit of the Federal Republic of Germany
 Ms. Margaret Atwood, C.C., O.Ont., C.H.

From the President of Hungary

Officer's Cross of the Order of Merit of Hungary 
 Ms. Anna Szenthe
 Mr. Zoltán Vass

Knight's Cross of the Order of Merit of Hungary
 Mr. Ábel Nagytóthy-Tóth

Gold Cross of Merit of Hungary
 Mr. Laszlo Szabo
 Mr. Tamás Kálmán Kontra
 Ms. Sophia Alexandra Zsigmond Szoke

From the President of the Italian Republic

Commander of the Order of the Star of Italy
 Ms. Yolanda McKimmie

From His Majesty The Emperor of Japan

Order of the Rising Sun, Gold Rays with Neck Ribbon

 Mr. David Worts

Order of the Rising Sun, Gold Rays with Rosette

 Mr. Dan Goodman
 Mr. Gaëtan Labadie
 Mr. Wu Pao-shuen (Frankie)
 Mr. Jacob Kovalio

Order of the Rising Sun, Gold and Silver Rays

 Mr. Dereck Oikawa
 Mr. Chris Spearman
 Mr. Ronald Starr
 Ms. Masako Takahatake
 Ms. Suzanne Éthier
 Mr. Wan Tat Kong

Order of the Rising Sun, Gold and Silver Star
 The Honourable David Tkachuk

Order of the Rising Sun, Silver Rays

 Ms. Keiko Belair

From the President of the Republic of Korea

Order of National Security Merit, Guksun Medal

 Lieutenant-General Wayne Donald Eyre, C.M.M., M.S.C., C.D.

Korea Service Medal
 Lieutenant-General Wayne Donald Eyre, C.M.M., M.S.C., C.D.
 Commander Samuel Edward Patchell, C.D.
 Captain Richard Thomas Detlef Spiller
 Colonel Richard Tod Strickland, C.D.
 Major Gordon James Barr, C.D.
 Master Corporal Jean-Ricardo Cleophat
 Major Shona Ann Durno Couturier
 Lieutenant-Colonel Gordon James Danylchuk, C.D.
 Lieutenant-Colonel Robert Glen Hart, C.D.
 Warrant Officer Andréanne Lise Micheline Joly, M.M.M., C.D.
 Warrant Officer Simon Joseph Pierre Labadie, C.D.
 Major Susan Adele Magill, C.D.
 Lieutenant-Commander Ji-Hwan Park, C.D.
 Colonel Stewart William Taylor, C.D.
 Sergeant Chad Edward Walker, C.D.
 Captain(N) Robert Jeffrey Watt, C.D.
 Major Christian Dominik Whelan, C.D.

From the Government of the Republic of Latvia

Order of the Three Stars, Fourth Class

 Ms. Vizma Mara Maksins

From His Royal Highness the Grand Duke of Luxembourg

Knight of the Order of the Oak Crown

 Mr. Paul Willox

From the Secretary General of the North Atlantic Treaty Organization

NATO Meritorious Service Medal

 Lieutenant-Colonel David Ross Canavan, M.S.M., C.D.
 Commodore Marie Thérèse Josée Kurtz, O.M.M., C.D.
 Colonel Timothy David Charles Marcella, M.S.M., C.D.
 Lieutenant-Colonel Allan Glen MacNeil, C.D.
 Warrant Officer Gregory J. Slate, C.D.

NATO Meritorious Service Medal, Second Award
 Mr. Scott Alfred Bruce

NATO Non-Article 5 Medal for the ISAF Operation
 Mr. Scott Alfred Bruce
 Mr. John-Paul Gravelines
 Mr. James Wood

NATO Non-Article 5 Medal for Operation Resolute Support
 Mr. Scott Alfred Bruce
 Mr. Kevin Sorenson

From the President of the Republic of Poland

Officer's Cross of the Order of Polonia Restituta
 Mr. Stefan Olbrecht

Knight's Cross of the Order of Polonia Restituta 
 Mr. Wladyslaw Pilipiak

Cross with Swords of the Order of the Cross of Independence

 Mr. Zbigniew Franciszek Pierscianowski (posthumous)

Siberian Exiles Cross

 Ms. Alice Basarke
 Mr. Andrzej Dabrowski (posthumous)
 Ms. Joanna Erland
 Ms. Maria Gajdecki
 Ms. Teresa Kosierb
 Mr. Feliks Tadeusz Kosierb
 Mr. Mieczyslaw Król
 Ms. Krystyna Makomaski
 Mr. Rafal Przednówek
 Ms. Helena Szuta
 Ms. Helena Tkaczewski

From the President of Ukraine

Order of Merit, 3rd Class

 Ms. Lenna Koszarny
 Mr. Taras Bahriy

Cross of Ivan Mazepa

 Mr. Marco Levytsky
 Dr. James Rutka

From the President of the United States of America

Legion of Merit

Commander of the Legion of Merit

 Lieutenant-General Wayne Donald Eyre, C.M.M., M.S.C., C.D.

Officer of the Legion of Merit, Second Award

 Lieutenant-General Christopher John Coates, C.M.M., M.S.M., C.D.
 Lieutenant-General Joseph Christian Giles Juneau, C.M.M., M.S.M., C.D. (retired)
 Major-General Joseph Raymond Marc Gagné, O.M.M., M.S.C., M.S.M., C.D.
 Major-General David Craig Aitchison, C.D.

Officer of the Legion of Merit

 Brigadier-General Peter Kenneth Scott, C.D.
 Brigadier-General Christopher Charles Ayotte, O.M.M., C.D.
 Major-General Marie Annabelle Jennie Carignan, C.M.M., M.S.M., C.D.
 Major-General David William Lowthian, O.M.M., M.S.M., C.D. (Ret'd)
 Brigadier-General Paul James Peyton, M.S.M., C.D.

Legionnaire of the Legion of Merit

 Colonel Richard Tod Strickland, C.D.
 Colonel Stewart William Taylor, C.D.

Bronze Star Medal

 Captain Alexander J. Buck, C.D.
 Colonel Denis Pierre Gerard Guy Boucher, O.M.M., C.D.

Defence Meritorious Service Medal

 Corporal Carl William Boland
 Master Sailor Amanda Yvonne Clancy
 Captain Thomas J.H. Geilen, C.D.
 Major Andrew W. McGregor, C.D.
 Sergeant Karine Gil Georgette Christine Moreau, C.D.
 Sergeant John E. Sullivan, C.D.
 Major Kaitlin A. Baskerville, C.D.
 Major Matthew P. Coughlin
 Captain Shona Ann Durno Couturier
 Lieutenant-Colonel Gordon J. Danylchuk, C.D.
 Colonel Benoit Michel Vincent Giroux, C.D.
 Commander Stephan R. Gresmak, C.D.
 Major Rony Khalil
 Lieutenant Gabrielle M. C. L. Lajoie
 Master Warrant Officer J. G. Steve Lambert, C.D.
 Major Michael G. L. Lee, C.D.
 Major Susan Adele Magill, C.D.
 Major Tahir M. Malik, C.D.
 Major Dennis S. Maringer, C.D.
 Major Ryan W. Matthies, C.D.
 Lieutenant-Colonel Donald J. McKillop, C.D.
 Lieutenant-Colonel Shaun D. O'Leary, C.D.
 Lieutenant-Commander Jill A. L. Page, C.D.
 Lieutenant-Colonel D. R. Piers Pappin, C.D.
 Colonel J. Marcel Yvon Daniel Rivière, C.D.
 Lieutenant-Colonel Norman A. R. Ruttle, C.D.
 Captain Justin J. Salter
 Captain Mark W. Spears
 Major Kyle D. Spindler, C.D.
 Warrant Officer Bryan D. Toope, C.D.
 Lieutenant-Colonel Lisa Marie Baspaly-Hays, O.M.M., C.D.
 Captain(N) Jeffrey Allan Biddiscombe, M.M.M., C.D.
 Major Cullen Patrick Downey, M.S.M., C.D.
 Colonel Eric Sabin Joseph Joffre Fortin, C.D.
 Colonel Edward Allan Scott Gillingham, C.D.
 Major Michael Kenneth Harris, C.D.
 Major Codi Alexander Micklethwaite, C.D.
 Major Leslie Deanne Wenzel, C.D.
 Major Garrett J. Milne, C.D.
 Major Gordon James Barr, C.D.
 Colonel Timothy James Bishop, O.M.M., M.S.M., C.D.
 Major Jonathan David Vincent Bussey, C.D.
 Major Daniel David Corkum, C.D.
 Chief Warrant Officer Dwayne Nelson Earle, C.D.
 Colonel Richard Aaron Taylor Harvie, C.D. (Retired)
 Staff Sergeant Erik Howells
 Warrant Officer Andréanne Lise Micheline Joly, M.M.M., C.D.
 Chief Warrant Officer René Kiens, M.M.M., M.S.M., C.D.
 Warrant Officer Simon Joseph Pierre Labadie, C.D.
 Master Warrant Officer Patrick Timothy Love, M.M.M., C.D.
 Major Luc Pierre Martin, C.D.
 Lieutenant-Colonel Kevin Henny K. L. Ng, C.D.
 Colonel Joseph Normand Marc Parent, C.D.
 Sergeant Franco D. Pittui
 Major Scott Malcolm Sinclair, C.D.
 Major Peter Dyck Teichroeb, C.D.
 Captain(N) Michael Edward Thomson, M.S.M., C.D.

Meritorious Service Medal

 Lieutenant-Colonel A. Frédéric Guénette, C.D.
 Lieutenant-Colonel Brendan C. Insley, C.D.
 Major Michael Wayne Lang, C.D.
 Major Jack P. Nguyen, C.D.
 Lieutenant-Colonel François Perreault, C.D.
 Lieutenant-Colonel Christopher Ray Adams, C.D.
 Captain Joseph Michael S. Dussault, C.D.
 Lieutenant-Colonel Joshua Andrew Klemen, M.S.M., C.D.
 Major Maurice Paul Raymond Ricard, C.D.
 Major Malcolm Alastair McMurachy, M.M.M., C.D.
 Major Joel Douglas Levandier, C.D.
 Major Philippe Turcotte, C.D.
 Lieutenant-Colonel Theodore Bernhard Weber, C.D.
 Lieutenant-Colonel Timothy Ernest Woods, C.D.

Air Medal

 Lieutenant-Colonel Dale M. Campbell, C.D.
 Major Michael P. Garrett
 Sergeant Douglas J. James, C.D.
 Major Ian R. McDonald, C.D.
 Major Stephen Angus McLean, C.D.
 Master Corporal Zachary D. Niemelainen, C.D.
 Captain Viktor Antun Spanovic
 Captain Dennis Gordon Williams
 Major Justin J. Boates, C.D.
 Major David J. Foyers, C.D.
 Sergeant Kathryn M. Gautier, C.D.
 Captain Robert T. Kropaczewski
 Warrant Officer Raymond E. C. Moggy, C.D.
 Captain Niko P. J. Politis, C.D.
 Sergeant Patrick E. Porter, C.D.
 Master Corporal Francis D. Roller
 Major Brian James Coyle, C.D.
 Master Corporal Devin Edward Tuck

Air Medal, Second Oak Leaf Cluster

 Major Michael P. Garrett
 Major Ian R. McDonald, C.D.
 Captain Alexander J. Buck, C.D.
 Chief Warrant Officer Joseph Dominique Georges Martin, C.D.
 Lieutenant-Colonel Joseph Daniel Steeve Veillette, C.D.

Air Medal, First Oak Leaf Cluster

 Major Michael P. Garrett
 Major Ian R. McDonald, C.D.
 Major David A. Murphy, C.D.
 Colonel Donald Thomas Saunders, C.D.

Errata of Commonwealth and Foreign Orders, Decorations and Medal awarded to Canadians

Corrections from 26 June 2021 
The notice published on page 2958 of the 31 October 2020 issue of the Canada Gazette, Part I, contained an error. Accordingly, the following modifications are made.
 Delete the following award: From Her Majesty The Queen in Right of the United Kingdom of the United Kingdom, Officer of the Most Excellent Order of the British Empire to Mr. Tony Sau-wo Yu, Replace with the following: Member of the Most Excellent Order of the British Empire (Civil Division) to Mr. Tony Sau-wo Yu.

The notice published on page 812 of the February 27, 2021 issue of the Canada Gazette, Part I, contained an error. Accordingly, the following modifications are made.
 Delete the following award: From His Majesty The Emperor of Japan, the Order of the Rising Sun, Gold and Silver Rays to Mr. Dereck Oikawa, Replace with the following: the Order of the Rising Sun, Gold and Silver Rays to Mr. Stephen Dereck Oikawa

References 

Orders, decorations, and medals of Canada
New Year Honours
Canadian